The 1942 Illinois Fighting Illini football team was an American football team that represented the University of Illinois during the 1942 Big Ten Conference football season.  In their first season under head coach Ray Eliot, the Illini compiled a 6–4 record and finished in a tie for third place in the Big Ten Conference. End Elmer Engel was selected as the team's most valuable player.

Schedule

References

Illinois
Illinois Fighting Illini football seasons
Illinois Fighting Illini football